Zacharias Chaliabalias (8 March 1946 – 22 July 2020) was a Greek international footballer who spent his entire career with Iraklis playing as a centre-back.

Club career
Chaliabalias was born in Thessaloniki, and started his career for Iraklis in 1964. He was driven out of the club in 1975, after he admitted to a bribe attempt by Panathinaikos officials. Chaliabalias is the fifth all-time leader in league appearances for Iraklis, appearing in no less than 280 occasions for the club.

International career
Chaliabalias made his debut for Greece in a friendly 4-1 home win against Egypt on 21 November 1968. Totally he gained three caps for Greece.

References

Greece international footballers
Greek footballers
Iraklis Thessaloniki F.C. players
Association football central defenders
1946 births
2020 deaths
Footballers from Thessaloniki